Look magazine can refer to:

 Look (American magazine), 1937 to 1971
 Look (UK magazine)
 Look (Australian magazine)